A humster is a hybrid cell line made from a hamster oocyte fertilized with human sperm. It always consists of single cells, and cannot form a multi-cellular being. Humsters are usually destroyed before they divide into two cells; were they left alone to divide, they would still be unviable.

Humsters are routinely created mainly for two reasons:

 To avoid legal issues with working with pure human embryonic stem cell lines.
 To assess the viability of human sperm for in vitro fertilization

Somatic cell hybrids between humans and hamsters or mice have been used for the mapping of various traits since at least the 1970s.

See also

 Hamster zona-free ovum test
 Recombinant DNA
 Human-animal hybrid

References 

Humans and Hybrids: A Critique of the Western Moral Framework
Junca et al. (1983) "Evaluation of human sperm fertility by interspecific (human spermatozoa-hamster oocytes) in vitro fertilization." Acta Eur. Fertil. 14, 191-196

Further reading 
Analysis of the first cell cycle in the cross between hamster eggs and human sperm

Cell biology
Bioethics
Mammal hybrids
Human hybrids
Intergeneric hybrids